The Croatian Bocce Federation (HBS) is the governing body of the game of bocce in Croatia. The federation's president is Nediljko Rojnica.

The HBS was founded in 1950. It currently organizes the following competitions:
Croatian First Bocce League
Croatian Second Bocce League
Croatian Third Bocce League
Croatian Bocce Cup

The HBS also organizes a national team.

External links 
Croatian Bocce Federation

Bocce
Sports organizations established in 1950